DTDC Express Limited (also known as DTDC or Desk to Desk Courier & Cargo) is an Indian courier delivery services company, headquartered in Bangalore. DTDC handles 12 million shipments every month.

History
In 2012, it acquired a 52 percent stake in Eurostar Express of Eurostar Group in UAE. In April 2013, DTDC acquired 70% of Nikkos Logistics. In June 2013, French courier company GeoPost (owned by La Poste) acquired a 39% stake in DTDC from Reliance Capital's private equity arm, taking its overall ownership in DTDC to 42%.

See also 
 Courier in India
 Indian Postal Service

References

Express mail
Logistics companies of India
Indian companies established in 1990
Indian brands
Companies based in Bangalore
1990 establishments in Karnataka